The 2019–20 Belmont Bruins men's basketball team represented Belmont University in the 2019–20 NCAA Division I men's basketball season. The Bruins, led by first-year head coach Casey Alexander, played their home games at the Curb Event Center in Nashville, Tennessee as members of the Ohio Valley Conference. They finished the season 26–7, 15–3 in OVC play to finish in a tie for the OVC regular season championship. They defeated Eastern Kentucky and Murray State to be champions of the OVC tournament. They earned the OVC's automatic bid to the NCAA tournament. However, the NCAA Tournament was cancelled amid the COVID-19 pandemic.

Previous season
The Bruins finished the 2018–19 season 27–6 overall, 16–2 in OVC play to finish as Ohio Valley regular season co-champions, alongside Murray State. In the OVC tournament, they defeated Austin Peay in the semifinals, advancing to the championship, where they were defeated by Murray State. Due to their successful season, they received an at-large bid into the NCAA tournament, earning the No. 11 seed in the East Region. They were matched up against fellow No. 11 seed Temple in the First Four, winning the game 81–70, earning their first NCAA Tournament win in program history. They faced No. 6 seeded Maryland in the first round, nearly pulling off the upset, losing 77–79.

On April 1, 2019, longtime head coach Rick Byrd announced that he was retiring, after leading the team for 33 years. On April 10, Lipscomb head coach and Belmont alum Casey Alexander was named as Byrd's successor.

Roster

Schedule and results

|-
!colspan=12 style=| Non-conference regular season

|-
!colspan=9 style=| OVC regular season

|-
!colspan=12 style=| Ohio Valley Conference tournament
|-

Source

References

Belmont Bruins men's basketball seasons
Belmont Bruins
Belmont Bruins men's basketball
Belmont Bruins men's basketball